LC Waikiki or also known as LCW, is an Istanbul based chain ready-to-wear fashion company with 54.000 employees. The company took its name from the Waikiki Beach at the Hawaii  and the initial letters of the French word of  "Les Copains" (Friends of).

Early history 

The company was founded in France in 1988. It became a Turkish organization in 1997 after a purchase by Tema Tekstil. The brand gained popularity in the 1990s with clothes featuring its monkey mascot.

Stores

International 

After the acquisition of the Taha Tekstil, the first store is opened in Romania and in March 2020, the company has 1,004 stores in 47 countries. In 2021, the company opened its first store in Latin America.

Turkey 

In Turkey, the company has more than 400 stores in 80 provinces.

Other Stores 

 LC Waikiki Home
 LC Waikiki Outlet
 LC Waikiki Dream
 LC Waikiki Baby
 LC Waikiki Steps
 LC Waikiki Look

References 

Turkish brands
Clothing companies established in 1988
Manufacturing companies established in 1988
French companies established in 1988
1997 mergers and acquisitions
Companies based in Istanbul
Clothing companies of Turkey